South Charles Town Historic District is a national historic district located at Charles Town, Jefferson County, West Virginia.  The primarily residential district encompasses 145 contributing buildings and 2 contributing structures.  It includes a number of examples of high style residential architecture and older architectural forms that survived the American Civil War. This architecture reflects the growing prosperity and economic diversity of Charles Town in the years between 1840 and 1950.

It was listed on the National Register of Historic Places in 2009.

References

Buildings and structures in Charles Town, West Virginia
National Register of Historic Places in Jefferson County, West Virginia
Historic districts in Jefferson County, West Virginia
Houses on the National Register of Historic Places in West Virginia
Commercial buildings on the National Register of Historic Places in West Virginia
Houses in Jefferson County, West Virginia
Historic districts on the National Register of Historic Places in West Virginia
2009 establishments in West Virginia